Zalužany is a municipality and village in Příbram District in the Central Bohemian Region of the Czech Republic. It has about 300 inhabitants.

Etymology
The name is derived from za luhem or za luží, i.e. "behind a meadow". It referred to its location.

Geography
It lies in the Benešov Uplands. There are several small ponds in the municipal territory.

History

A Slavic settlement was founded in the area of today's Zalužany between the 8th and 10th centuries. In the 13th century, the village belonged under the administration of the royal castle of Kamýk nad Vltavou. The first written mention of Zalužany is from 1291 when King Wenceslaus II donated it to the Ostrov monastery near Davle.

In the 14th century, the village had been divided in two parts. The smaller one belonged under the administration of the royal Orlík Castle and the larger one was consecutively owned by a line of noble families. This state continued in the following centuries.

Transport
The I/4 road that replaces the missing section of the D4 motorway runs through the municipality.

Sights

The most valuable part of Zalužany is the historical centre with the Zalužany Castle. A fortess from the 15th century was rebuilt into the Renaissance castle the mid-17th century. Today, the castle houses several exhibitions.

A Jewish cemetery, protected as a cultural monument, is located next to the castle.

The pseudo-Gothic Church of Saint Charles Borromeo was built in 1872–1874.

References

External links

Villages in Příbram District